David Dewitt Turpeau Sr. (November 8, 1873 – February 13, 1947) was a Methodist minister and state legislator in Ohio. He wrote an autobiography. He was elected to the Ohio House of Representatives in 1939 and served in it until his death. He was a Republican.

He was born in St. Martinville, Louisiana.

Leontine T. Kelly (Leontine Turpeau) was one of his children.

See also
List of African-American officeholders (1900–1959)

References

External links

1873 births
1947 deaths
African-American state legislators in Ohio
Place of death unknown
American Methodist clergy
20th-century African-American writers
20th-century American male writers
American autobiographers
People from St. Martinville, Louisiana
Republican Party members of the Ohio House of Representatives
Methodists from Ohio
African-American Methodist clergy
Politicians from Cincinnati